Adramita is a monotypic genus of grasshoppers in the subfamily Cyrtacanthacridinae with a species found in the Arabian peninsula.

Species 
The following species is recognised in the genus Adramita:
 Adramita arabica (Uvarov, 1930)

References 

Acrididae
Insects of the Middle East
Taxa named by Boris Uvarov
Caelifera genera
Monotypic Orthoptera genera